Greenwood Laboratory School is a comprehensive K-12 laboratory school affiliated with, and located on the campus of, Missouri State University in Springfield, Missouri, United States.

Enrollment
The school has an enrollment of approximately 374 students, and about 30 or so faculty members. As of 2011, approximately 120 students were enrolled in the high school. The average graduating class is about 30 students.

Academics
The school provides education for children aged from kindergarten through to grade 12. From 2002 to 2008, the average ACT scores have ranged between 25 and 26, exceeding state and national averages by 4 to 6 points. Greenwood states that 100% of graduates go on to attend college.

Activities
The Greenwood Lab School mascot is the Blue Jay and the school colors are blue and white, with black or red serving as accent colors. Activities offered include speech & debate, basketball, golf, soccer, tennis, baseball, cross country, track & field, concert band, concert choir, cheerleading, Spanish club, math club, National Honors Society, and student council. Football was formerly a sport until the early 1990s when soccer was given preference over football. Girls Soccer was started in 2007.

Boys soccer
Soccer has been Greenwood's most notable sport since its inception in 1990 when it began as a club team. In the 1990s, Boys Soccer was coached by former Missouri State Bears player Jan Stahle, himself a Greenwood Alumni. From 1992 to 1999 Greenwood Boys Soccer fielded a team in the District Championship Game with 7 consecutive District Championships from 1992 to 1998. In 1992 and 1998 the team made it to the State Quarterfinals. From 1993 to 1997, Greenwood Boys Soccer made it to the State Championship round, placing 4th in 1993, 3rd in 1994, and 2nd in 1995–1997. During the 1996 season, Greenwood Boys Soccer had a National Record of 23 consecutive shutouts. In 2005, Greenwood Boys Soccer returned to its old form posting a 15-9-4 record, a District Championship, and a 3rd Place finish in the State Championship round.

Notable alumni
 Joe Haymes, American jazz bandleader and arranger
 Billy Long, 7th District Congressman from Missouri, auctioneer and politician
 Payne Stewart, professional golfer, competed on the school's football, basketball and golf teams.
 Aminu Mohammed, Professional basketball player for the Delaware Blue Coats of the NBA G League

References

External links
http://education.missouristate.edu/greenwood/

Public middle schools in Missouri
Public elementary schools in Missouri
Public high schools in Missouri
Schools in Springfield, Missouri
Missouri State University
Educational institutions established in 1908
High schools in Greene County, Missouri
1908 establishments in Missouri